Engolo or NGolo (Kikongo word meaning strength, power) is a performance of ritual combat by various ethnic groups around the Cunene River in southern Angola. The style of fighting involves various kicks, dodges, and leg sweeps, with an emphasis on inverted positions, i.e. with one or more hands on the ground. The first mention of Engolo in literature was made by Albano Neves e Sousa in a set of drawings demonstrating various techniques and their similarities to the Afro-Brazilian art form of Capoeira in the 1960s. Engolo is one of several African martial arts of the African Diaspora in the Americas.

Neves e Sousa described Engolo as part of a rite of passage, Omuhelo, between young boys vying for a bride in the contest, and whose techniques derived from the peculiar way in which Zebras fight amongst themselves. Research carried out by Dr. TJ Desch Obi finds that Engolo itself is not strictly performed for any one ritual, but as an element in various public and private performances.

In his book Fighting for Honor, as well as his article "Combat and Crossing of the Kalunga", Desch Obi draws parallels between the circle space used in the Engolo and the inverted techniques with the Kalunga cosmology, in which the spirit–ancestor world is inverted as a world of opposites: where men walk on their feet, the spirits walk on their hands, where men are black, the spirits are white, where men reach their peak physical abilities in life, the ancestors reach their peak spirituality. He states that men in performing Engolo with its inverted positions connect themselves physically and spiritually with the ancestors, and with specific ancestral warriors of the past.

See also
Kalunga line

Notes

Further reading
Da minha África e do Brasil que eu vi, Albano Neves e Sousa. Angola: Ed. Luanda.
 

African martial arts